The Argon people are a community in the Indian union territory of Ladakh.

References 
Citations

Bibliography

Social groups of Jammu and Kashmir
Ethnic groups in Ladakh